Blas García may refer to:

 Blas García Montero (born 1995), Argentine footballer
 Blas García Ravelo, Spanish sculptor